Anaiyur is a part of Sivakasi city. It was once a panchayat town in Sivakasi block of Virudhunagar district. The town of anaiyur is soon to be integrated with new Sivakasi city municipal corporation.

It includes the residential areas like Reserveline, Anaiyur, Indira Nagar and Bharathi Nagar. 

The Sivakasi industrial estate which was initiated in yearly 1950's is situated here.

Demographics
 India census, Anaiyur had a population of 19,847. Males constituted 50% of the population and females 50%.

Transport
Anaiyur is situated in the main area of Sivakasi-Srivilliputhur Highway (state highways-42 SH 42). There is no bus stand in Anaiyur. The nearest bus stand is Sivakasi bus stand located at a distance of 5.7 km. Another bus stand is located at Thiruthangal at a distance of 7 to 8 km.

Railway Station:
1. Sivakasi railway station (2 to 3 km)
2. Thiruthangal railway station (7 to 8 km)

Schools

The government higher secondary school 
and SCMS school are located in Anaiyur to meet the educational needs.

Some private schools are also located here to cater the educational needs of the town.

Adjacent communities

References

Cities and towns in Virudhunagar district